Gudarzi (also Romanized as Gūdarzī, Goodarzi, and Gowdarzī; also known as Gowd-e Razī and Manţaqeh-ye Gowdarzī) is a village in Khuzi Rural District, Varavi District, Mohr County, Fars Province, Iran. At the 2006 census, its population was 22, in 6 families.

References 

Populated places in Mohr County